Alexander Korsantia (born 1965, Tbilisi) is a Georgian pianist.

Alexander immigrated to Canada in 1992, settling in Vancouver, British Columbia. After living in Vancouver for a number of years, he moved to Boston, Massachusetts.

He won the 1988 Sydney International Piano Competition (as a Soviet citizen) and the 1995 Arthur Rubinstein Competition in Tel Aviv. He is a member of the piano faculty at Boston's New England Conservatory.

In 1999 Korsantia was decorated with the National Honor Medal from the Georgian Government.

References

Living people
1965 births
Classical pianists from Georgia (country)
Sydney International Piano Competition prize-winners
Musicians from Tbilisi
21st-century classical pianists